Dylan Ferguson (born September 20, 1998) is a Canadian professional ice hockey goaltender currently with the  Ottawa Senators of the National Hockey League (NHL). Ferguson was originally selected 194th overall in the 2017 NHL Entry Draft by the Dallas Stars before he was traded to the Vegas Golden Knights. He was born in Vancouver and grew up in Lantzville, British Columbia.

Playing career
Ferguson played midget hockey in the Saskatoon Midget Hockey League with the Notre Dame Hounds as he was selected 166th overall by the Kamloops Blazers in the 2013 WHL Bantam Draft. Ferguson played two more seasons with the Hounds before signing with the Blazers in 2015.

Following his second season of major junior hockey with the Blazers in 2016–17, Ferguson was selected with the 194th overall pick in the 2017 NHL Entry Draft by the Dallas Stars. However, he was traded to the Vegas Golden Knights on June 27 (only two days after he was drafted) with a second-round pick in the 2020 NHL Entry Draft in exchange for Marc Methot.

On September 28, 2017, the Golden Knights signed Ferguson to a three-year, entry level contract. He began the 2017–18 season with the Blazers. However, on October 31, Ferguson was called up by the Golden Knights under emergency basis following a number of goaltending injuries. Ferguson made his NHL debut on November 14, in relief of Maxime Lagacé against the Edmonton Oilers in which he allowed one goal on two shots in 9:14 of playing time. Ferguson was returned to the Blazers on November 17 after the Golden Knights activated Malcolm Subban from injured reserve. As the Blazers failed to make a postseason run, the Golden Knights called up Ferguson as their third backup goalie during the 2018 Stanley Cup playoffs.

Ferguson returned to the Blazers for the 2018–19 season after attending the Golden Knights training camp. During the Blazers season-opening week,  Ferguson was named the WHL Goaltender of the Week after he recorded a 1.00 goals-against-average and a 0.970 save percentage.

The Golden Knights declined to issue a qualifying offer to Ferguson at the conclusion of his entry-level contract, making him an unrestricted free agent. Ferguson then signed a professional tryout agreement (PTO) with the Toronto Maple Leafs on August 11, 2022. After attending the Maple Leafs training camp and pre-season, Ferguson was re-assigned to join the Leafs' AHL affiliate, the Toronto Marlies, to begin the 2022–23 season on a PTO. Ferguson made five appearances with the Marlies before he was loaned to the Wichita Thunder of the ECHL on February 23, 2023. Before making an appearance with the Thunder, Ferguson was traded by the Marlies to the Belleville Senators in exchange for future considerations on February 24. He was then signed to a two-way contract for the remainder of the season with Belleville Senators' NHL affiliate, the Ottawa Senators, on March 2, 2023.

Career statistics

Awards and honours

References

External links
 

1998 births
Living people
Athol Murray College of Notre Dame alumni
Belleville Senators players
Canadian ice hockey goaltenders
Chicago Wolves players
Dallas Stars draft picks
Fort Wayne Komets players
Henderson Silver Knights players
Kamloops Blazers players
People from the Regional District of Nanaimo
Ice hockey people from Vancouver
Toronto Marlies players
Vegas Golden Knights players